Leandro Gastón Sirino Rodríguez (born 22 February 1991) is a South African Uruguayan professional footballer who plays as a winger for South African Premier Division club Mamelodi Sundowns.

Career
Sirino is a former youth academy player of Peñarol. In January 2017, he joined Bolivian club Bolívar.

Sirino joined South African club Mamelodi Sundowns in January 2018. On 12 September 2020, he scored the winner in 2019–20 Nedbank Cup final against Bloemfontein Celtic. In reference to Mercedes-AMG, he is nicknamed as AMG among the Sundowns fans.

Career statistics

Honours
Bolívar
 Bolivian Primera División: 2016–17

Mamelodi Sundowns
 South African Premier Division: 2017–18, 2018–19, 2019–20, 2020–21, 2021–22
 Nedbank Cup: 2019–20, 2021–22
 Telkom Knockout: 2019
 MTN 8: 2021

References

External links
 
 

1991 births
Living people
Association football midfielders
Uruguayan footballers
Rampla Juniors players
Unión San Felipe footballers
San Luis de Quillota footballers
Club Bolívar players
Mamelodi Sundowns F.C. players
Chilean Primera División players
Primera B de Chile players
Bolivian Primera División players
South African Premier Division players
Uruguayan expatriate footballers
Uruguayan expatriate sportspeople in Chile
Uruguayan expatriate sportspeople in Bolivia
Uruguayan expatriate sportspeople in South Africa
Expatriate footballers in Chile
Expatriate footballers in Bolivia
Expatriate soccer players in South Africa